NYCxDesign, also known as New York City by Design, is an annual design festival in New York City which takes place every May. The festival is made up of independently hosted exhibitions, open studios, panel discussions, and other in-person and virtual events that take place in the five boroughs of New York City. The participants highlight a range of design and architecture related fields including furniture, interior design, graphic design and fashion. New York City mayor Eric Adams spoke at the opening ceremony of its 10th edition in 2022.

History & Operation 

In 2012 NYCEDC started NYCxDesign as a municipal initiative steered by a committee of leaders from New York City's design community. The 2019 edition was estimated to have attracted 300,000 visitors with its 400 odd events, which resulted in a total expenditure of approximately $111 million in New York City. The city announced that SANDOW would be taking over the operations in 2020. Since then, the festival has transitioned to become an independent non-profit organization.

References

Further reading 
 Architectural Digest - Highlights From a Whirlwind New York Design Week

External links 
 
 Instagram Profile

2013 establishments in New York City
Annual events in New York City
Festivals in New York City